The 2005 AFL Grand Final was an Australian rules football game contested between the Sydney Swans and West Coast Eagles at the Melbourne Cricket Ground on 24 September 2005. It was the 109th annual grand final of the Australian Football League (formerly the Victorian Football League), staged to determine the premiers for the 2005 AFL season. The match, attended by 91,898 spectators, was won by Sydney by a margin of four points, marking the club's fourth Premiership and their first since 1933.

It remains the highest-rating AFL game of all time (including 3.4 million metropolitan viewers) since the current OzTam measurement system was introduced in 2001. All told, a total average of 4.449 million people watched the game on TV nationally. It is one of the most-watched television broadcasts in Australia since 2001, ranked 8th overall. Put another way, one in every 4.5 Australians watched the game live (22.25% of all Australians).

Background

This was West Coast's first appearance in a grand final since winning the 1994 premiership, whilst it was Sydney's first since losing in 1996, and the Swans had not won a premiership since 1933 (as South Melbourne).

Two players from the Eagles' last premiership in 1994 were appearing in this grand final: Drew Banfield for the Eagles and Jason Ball for the Swans in his last AFL game.

At the conclusion of the home-and-away season, West Coast finished second on the AFL ladder behind Adelaide with 17 wins and five losses. Sydney finished third with 15 wins and seven losses. They met in the qualifying final at Domain Stadium, and West Coast won by four points.

The Eagles then punched their ticket to the grand final by defeating minor premiers Adelaide in their preliminary final by 16 points. Meanwhile, Nick Davis famously rescued Sydney in their semi-final at the SCG against Geelong with four 4th-quarter goals including one just seconds before the final siren. The Swans then overcame St Kilda in their preliminary final at the MCG after overturning a 7-point deficit going into the last quarter into a 31-point win with a seven-goal barrage.

In the week leading up to the grand final, West Coast's Ben Cousins was awarded the Brownlow Medal.

Match summary
West Coast opened the game aggressively, with Sydney struggling to get the ball to their end of the field. However, better goal kicking accuracy by the Swans put them ahead by two points at the first change.

In the second quarter Sydney appeared to be asserting control of the game, kicking three goals while the Eagles got none. However, after the long break, West Coast put their stamp on the game, kicking three goals while the Swans went goalless.

Both teams had seemingly easy goals that were missed, but the Eagles most clearly would remember theirs from the fourth quarter. With just under five minutes remaining in the match, West Coast's Brent Staker almost cost his team the match following a 50-metre penalty to the Swans sending them out of their defensive 50 in a very costly play. With the Swans holding a five-point lead in the closing moments, Sydney's Tadhg Kennelly rushed a behind to blunt a ferocious Eagles attack.  After the ensuing kick in, West Coast regained control of the ball and sent a long kick back to the half-forward line by Dean Cox. Sydney's Leo Barry responded by taking a mark in the midst of the pack full of Eagles players (with the commentator Stephen Quartermain saying a sequence of words made famous through frequent replays: "Leo Barry, you star!"), denying the Eagles an opportunity to kick a game-winner on or after the final siren, thus ensuring that the Swans would win their first premiership in 72 years (when they were South Melbourne), ending the longest premiership drought in VFL/AFL history.

The match has been labelled as a 'classic', with the final margin being the closest since the 1977 drawn grand final. This was the first time since the 1989 VFL Grand Final that the grand final was decided by a goal or less.

Eagles player Chris Judd was awarded the Norm Smith Medal for being judged the best player afield, although he finished on the losing side; this is one of only four instances of a Grand Final player having won a Norm Smith Medal without being on the winning premiership team.

The same teams met again in the 2006 AFL Grand Final, in another close match, with the Eagles emerging victors by one point.

Norm Smith Medal

Teams

Scorecard

Match statistics

Entertainment

See also 
 2005 AFL finals series
 2005 AFL season

References

VFL/AFL Grand Finals
Afl Grand Final, 2005
Sydney Swans
West Coast Eagles